Donald Lawrence (born May 4, 1961, Gastonia, North Carolina) is an American gospel music songwriter, record producer and artist. He is best known for his Grammy Award-nominated songs "The Blessing of Abraham" and "Encourage Yourself".

He studied at Cincinnati Conservatory, where he earned a Bachelor of Fine Arts Degree in music. He has received multiple Grammy and Stellar Award honors and served as vocal coach to the R&B group En Vogue, was the musical director for Stephanie Mills, songwriter for The Clark Sisters, and collaborator with a host of artists including Peabo Bryson, Kirk Franklin, Karen Clark Sheard, Donnie McClurkin, and Mary J. Blige.

Biography
Lawrence took on The Tri-City Singers after a friend vacated his position as musical director. (The three cities that The Tri-City Singers come from are Spartanburg, SC, Gastonia, NC, and Charlotte, NC.) The group debuted in 1993 with A Songwriter's Point Of View on a then-brand-new independent record label called GospoCentric Records. The set debuted at No. 2 on the Billboard Top Gospel Charts. The group's follow-up release Bible Stories would top those same charts when it arrived in 1995. It was the first to be billed as Donald Lawrence & The Tri-City Singers and featured black church-ubiquitous hits such as "A Message For The Saints", "I Am God" and "Stranger". The album was released on Lawrence's newly minted label Crystal Rose Records which was distributed through Sparrow Records.

In 1997, Donald Lawrence produced the live portion of Karen Clark Sheard's Grammy-nominated Finally Karen debut. Lawrence & Tri-City also released the seasonal Hello Christmas the same year. Later, Lawrence signed a contract with the Island Records imprint Island Inspirational. Though a live recording did take place for release, the album never materialized.

In 2000, Donald Lawrence & The Tri-City Singers signed to EMI Gospel. To promote the new album, a maxi CD of the lead single "Testify" to the mainstream. House remixes by Junior Vasquez sent the song to No. 33 on Billboard's Mainstream Dance Charts. When tri-city4.com was finally released in late summer 2000, the set peaked at #2 on Billboard's Top Gospel Charts and #13 on Billboard's Heatseekers Charts. The album also got a profile boost from the all-star standout "God's Favor", featuring vocal turns from Karen Clark Sheard, Kim Burrell, and Kelly Price.

Lawrence waited almost two years before delivering the follow-up Go Get Your Life Back in early 2002. "The Best Is Yet to Come", a song sonically much in the vein of the previous smash "Testify," was chosen as the album's lead single. This release featured guest appearances from Ann Nesby (formerly of Sounds of Blackness) and gospel pioneer Bishop Walter Hawkins. The momentum continued with the 2003 release of Restoring The Years, a greatest hits album featuring two new songs.

The next album would mark a fresh start for Donald Lawrence. I Speak Life was his first solo album, the debut for his newly inked recording contract with Verity Records, and also the first release under his new sublabel Quiet Water Entertainment. Though the album was without The Tri-City Singers, guest appearances were plenteous. Donnie McClurkin, Hezekiah Walker, Faith Evans, Richard Smallwood, and Carl Thomas all contributed to the album. Even jazz notables Ramsey Lewis and Lalah Hathaway were on hand for a remake of the Bible Stories classic "Don't Forget To Remember". The effort earned Lawrence a total of 7 Stellar Award nominations, and 6 wins.

In March 2006, The Tri-City Singers announced that they would retire, but not before one last live recording. Finale: Act One and Finale: Act Two were released simultaneously on April 4, 2006. Each release was a CD/DVD set that chronicled the audio and video of one half of the concert, with packages that locked into one another respectively. A special edition of Finale was later released with both CDs and DVDs. The blowout concert included guest appearances from Bishop Walter Hawkins, Karen Clark Sheard, Vanessa Bell Armstrong, Daryl Coley, LaShun Pace, Darwin Hobbs, and many other gospel luminaries. The album's lead single "The Blessing Of Abraham" was nominated for a Grammy Award for Best Gospel Performance in December 2006. His sophomore solo album, The Law of Confession Part I was released in February 2009. Soon after, Donald said in an interview that The Law of Confession, Part II would be released soon, but that he was focusing on other projects.

Donald Lawrence was featured on the title track "Released" by Bill Winston presents Living Word".  He was also the host of Verizon's "How Sweet The Sound Choir Competition".

Discography

Albums
1993 A Songwriters Point Of View (The Tri-City Singers) (GospoCentric, 1993) (US Gospel #2)
1995 Bible Stories (Donald Lawrence & The Tri-City Singers) (Crystal Rose, 1995) (US Gospel No. 1, CCM #10)
1997 Hello Christmas(Donald Lawrence & The Tri-City Singers) (Star Song, 1997) (US Gospel #7)
2000 tri-city4.com (The Tri-City Singers) (EMI Gospel, 2000) (US Gospel No. 2, Heatseekers #13)
2002 Go Get Your Life Back (Donald Lawrence & The Tri-City Singers) (EMI Gospel, 2002) (US Gospel #4)
2003 The Best of Donald Lawrence & the Tri-City Singers: Restoring the Years (EMI Gospel, 2003) (US Gospel #21)
2004 I Speak Life (Donald Lawrence & Co.) (QWE/Verity, 2004) (US Gospel #2)
2006 Finale: Act One (Donald Lawrence & The Tri-City Singers) (EMI Gospel, 2006) (US Gospel #4)
2006 Finale: Act Two (Donald Lawrence & The Tri-City Singers) (EMI Gospel, 2006) (US Gospel #5)
2009 The Law of Confession, Part I(Donald Lawrence & Co.) (Zomba/Verity Records, 2009) (US #72, US Gospel #2)
2011 YRM (Your Righteous Mind)(Donald Lawrence & Co.) (Zomba/Verity Records, 2011) (US #41, US Gospel #1)
2013 20 Year Celebration, Vol. 1: Best for Last (Donald Lawrence & The Tri-City Singers) (eOne, 2013) (US Gospel #1)
2018  Goshen- Donald Lawrence and The Tri-City Singers Reunion album

Singles 
 "Don't Give Up" with Kirk Franklin, Hezekiah Walker, and Karen Clark Sheard (Island, 1996)
 "Testify (Remixes)" (The Tri-City Singers) (EMI Gospel, 2001)
 "Never Seen The Righteous" (The Tri-City Singers) (EMI Gospel, 2002)
"The Best Is Yet To Come" (The Tri-City Singers) (EMI Gospel, 2002)
 "The Blessing Of Abraham" (The Tri-City Singers) (EMI Gospel, 2006) (Billboard No. 97 R&B)
 "Back II Eden" (Donald Lawrence & Co.) (Zomba/Verity Records, 2009)
 "YRM (Your Righteous Mind" (Donald Lawrence & Co.) (Zomba/Verity Records, 2010)
 "Spiritual" (Donald Lawrence & Co.) (Zomba/Verity Records, 2011)
 "The Gift" (Donald Lawrence & Co.) (eOne Music, 2013)
 "Goshen 432HZ" (The Tri-City Singers) (Provident Label Group, 2019)

Awards
Stellar Awards 2006
 Artist of the Year for I Speak Life
 CD of the Year for I Speak Life
 Producer of the Year for I Speak Life
 Group/Duo of the Year for I Speak Life
 Contemporary Group/Duo of the Year for I Speak Life
 Contemporary CD of the Year for I Speak Life

Stellar Awards 2007
 Artist of the Year for Finale: Act One
 Choir of the Year for Finale: Act One
 Producer of the Year for Finale: Act One
 Contemporary CD of the Year for Finale: Act One
 Contemporary Choir of the Year for Finale: Act One
 Special Event CD of the Year for Finale: Act One
 Music Video of the Year for Finale: Act One

Stellar Awards 2008
 Producer of the Year for The Clark Sister – Live! One Last Time

Grammy Award Wins 

 Best Traditional Gospel Album (2007) for Live - One Last Time

Grammy Award Nominations

 Best Gospel Album by a Choir of Chorus (1995) for Bible Stories 
 Best Gospel Choir or Chorus Album (2000) for Tri-city4.com
 Best Gospel Choir or Chorus Album (2002) for Go Get Your Life Back 
 Best Gospel Choir or Chorus Album (2005) for I Speak Life 
 Best Gospel Performance (2006) for The Blessing Of Abraham
 Best Gospel Song (2006) for The Blessing Of Abraham
 Best Traditional Gospel Album (2006) for Finalé Act One
 Best Gospel Song (2007) for Encourage Yourself 
 Best Traditional Gospel Album (2007) for The Grand Finalé: Encourage Yourself 
 Best Traditional Gospel Album (2009) for The Law Of Confession, Part I 
 Best Gospel Song (2011) for Spiritual 
 Best Gospel Song (2012) for Released 
 Best Gospel Album (2013) for Best For Last: 20 Year Celebration Vol. 1 [Live]
 Best Gospel Performance/Song (2014) for Sunday A.M. [Live] 
 Best Gospel Album (2019) for Goshen

References

External links

EMI Gospel Official Website
Verity Records Official Website

Living people
African-American musicians
American gospel singers
Urban contemporary gospel musicians
1958 births
21st-century African-American people
20th-century African-American people